Maxim Leonidovich Leonidov (born February 13, 1962) is a Soviet and Russian musician, singer, actor, songwriter and TV presenter. He is known as one of the founders and members of the beat-quartet Sekret, and subsequently as a solo artist. In 1997, he won the Golden Gramophone Award.

Biography

Maxim Leonidovich Leonidov was born into a family of actors of the Leningrad Academic Comedy Theater. He was the son of Lyudmila Lyulko (July 10, 1923 - October 25, 1967) and one of the pioneers in theater Leonid Yefimovich Leonidov, whose real name was Shapiro (March 27, 1927 - April 30, 1996).

In 1979, Leonidov finished the Glinka Choral School attached to the Leningrad State Academic Chapel. In 1983, he graduated from the Russian State Institute of Performing Arts, under the tutelage of Arkady Katsman and Lev Dodin. He served in the army, being a member of the Song and Dance Ensemble of the Leningrad Military District, along with Nikolai Fomenko and Yevgeny Oleshev. Later that year, he became one of the founders of the popular Sekret beat-quartet (Maxim Leonidov, Nikolai Fomenko, Andrei Zabludovsky, Alexei Murashov). After six successful years, he left the group in 1989 and began a solo career.

In late 1990, along with his first wife, Irina Selezneva, he immigrated to Israel. Until 1996 he lived and worked in Tel Aviv, after which he returned to St. Petersburg. Periodically Leonidov collaborated with Sekret (mainly during the group's jubilees). In 2012, the musicians began to record new songs, and in 2013, they released their first album,16 years after Sekret 30.  

On February 13, 2015, at the Mongolian embassy in Russia, Leonidov received the "For the Motherland" award of the First Degree on his birthday. It was bestowed after a May 2014 tour in Mongolia to celebrating the 75th anniversary of the victory at Khalkhin-Gol against the Japanese. On the same day, he received the Chart Dozen prize as part of the Sekret beat-quartet.

Personal life
His first wife was Irina Selezneva. In September 1999, he married his second wife, actress Anne Banshchikova. They divorced in 2003. He is currently married to Alexandra Kamchatova, an actress in the Leningrad City Council. He has two children - a daughter named Maria born in 2004 and a son named Leonid born in 2008.

Hippoband

History of the group

Leonidov's group Hippoband was founded in March 1996, after he returned from Israel. They held their first concert in May the same year.The group's current name was devised in 2003 with the release of their album Hippopotazm. The album was named after Hippopotam, a song included in it. According to the musicians, Gustov had accidentally made a typo of the letter "Z" while typing the name of the song in the computer, after which the musicians decided to call themselves Hippoband. The group's logo was decorated with a hippopotamus, their totemic animal. The band's membership has remained stable since 1997, except when their first drummer Evgeny Lependin moved to Moscow to work with Vladimir Presnyakov Jr., and his place was taken by a young musician named Yuri Sonin.

Permanent group formation

 Maxim Leonidov - vocals, songwriter, guitar.
 Vladimir Gustov - guitar, vocals, arrangement. composer, guitarist harmonica and arranger. Most of the Hippoband albums have been recorded at his studio, 'Favourite'
 Evgeny Oleshev - keyboard, vocals, arrangement. He was Leonidov's choral school classmate.
 Yuri Guryev - bass guitar, vocals, group director. 
 Yuri Sonin - drums
 Evgeny Guriev - guitar

Sessional musicians
 Valery Shurygin - button accordion
 Mikhail Zhidkikh - saxophone
 Yoel Gonzalez - percussion
 Pavel Ivanov - percussion
 Vitaly Pogosyan - duduk

Group discography
 1996 - "Commander"
 1997 - "Sailing Over the City"
 1999 - "Do not let him go"
 2000 - "The best songs of 1985-2000"
 2001 - "Let's light up!" (An album of military songs)
 2001 - Thursday
 2003 - Hippopotazm
 2004 - "146 minutes in Russia" (live album)
 2006 - "Fundamentals of Feng Shui"
 2008 - "The World for Mary"
 2009 - "The Wild Thing"
 2009 - "House on the Mountain" (live album)
 2011 - "The Daddies of the Song"
 2017 - "Above"

Solo discography

Released albums
 1987 - "Recognition", "Melody". Mini-record, including four songs by composer Yakov Dubravin, performed by Leonidov.
 1992 - מקסים (Maxim). The first of two albums released in Israel, Leonidov's only album in Hebrew.
 1994 - "Highway of Memories". Leonidov's second album released in Israel, this time in Russian.
 1996 - "Commander". Album marking Leonidov's return to Russia. Recorded with session musicians, the album was produced by Alexander Kutikov, who worked in his time with "The Secret" on the recording of the band's first album.
 2009 - The Wild Thing. Leonidov recorded a new album with ex-compatriot, and now Canadian citizen Kirill Shirokov
 2016 - The Best. Leonidov recorded a new album, which included new songs and old hits. The album included 30 songs.

Unreleased albums
In 1990, after leaving Sekret, Leonidov's solo album was recorded with the group "Collected Works". It had six songs in English, but there is no information that it was ever released on a record or CD.

Albums with other artists
2000 - "Terrarium - Pentagonal sin", recorded together with Boris Grebenshchikov, Chizh & Co, Vyacheslav Butusov, Alexander Vasilyev and musicians of Aquarium
2003 - "A thin scar on my beloved pope", recorded together with Andrey Makarevich, Evgeny Margulis, Alyona Sviridova, Tatyana Lazareva and "Creole Tango Orchestra"

Awards
1997 - "Song of the Year", for the song "Vision"
1997 - Golden Gramophone Award, for the song "Vision"
2009 - National Award "Musical Heart of the Theater" in the nomination "Best Performer of the Main Role" for the role of Max Bialostok in the musical "Producers".
2010 - "Chart Dozen", for the song "Letter" in the nomination "Poetry"

Selected filmography
2003 — Deadly Force as Belov
2011 — Vysotsky. Thank You For Being Alive as Pavel Leonidov
2012 — The White Guard as officer

References

External links
 Official website

1962 births
20th-century Russian male singers
20th-century Russian singers
21st-century Russian male singers
21st-century Russian singers
Living people
Musicians from Saint Petersburg
Jewish Russian actors
Russian activists against the 2022 Russian invasion of Ukraine
Russian rock singers
Winners of the Golden Gramophone Award